In the 1891 season, Somerset County Cricket Club returned to first-class cricket after a five-year absence. They played in the official County Championship, which had been founded the previous year, for the first time, finishing in joint fifth place.

During the season, Somerset played thirteen first-class matches, twelve against other county sides, and one against the Marylebone Cricket Club (MCC). They finished with an equal number of wins and losses (six) and drew once. The county's two matches against Surrey were notable for antithetical reasons. When the two sides met in early June, Somerset suffered a heavy defeat, recording two of their lowest ever first-class totals. Just over two months later, when they faced each other again, Somerset won in the dying moments of the game, prompting a 133-line poem to be written in celebration of the victory.

Background
Having played what is generally considered their debut first-class match against Lancashire in 1882, Somerset were stripped of their first-class status following the 1885 season, after a string of heavy losses and matches in which they could not field eleven men.  Meetings were held at Somerset, and Henry Murray-Anderdon took over as secretary of the club.  Under his leadership, the club acquired a ground in Taunton, variously known as the 'Athletic Ground' and 'Rack Field'.  The land was extensively worked on until Murray-Anderdon announced that "opponents will want to come here and play".  In addition to improving the ground, the secretary targeted the universities to add talent to the team, and added two professional bowlers, George Nichols and Ted Tyler.

In 1890, Somerset played thirteen fixtures against other county sides, winning twelve and tying the remaining one, against Middlesex.  Tyler and Nichols claimed over 200 wickets between them, and Somerset won the 'Second-class' County Championship.  In December 1890, a meeting of the county secretaries at Lord's unanimously voted for Somerset to be admitted to the first-class County Championship.

Squad

Murray-Anderdon's targeting of the universities for players yielded three players who finished near the top of Somerset’s batting and bowling averages in 1891.  Brothers Lionel and Richard Palairet both appeared for Oxford University during the season, while Sammy Woods played for Cambridge University.  Woods and the two professionals, Nichols and Tyler, bowled the majority of overs for Somerset, and between them claimed 169 of the county’s 179 wickets.

Three of Somerset's players were chosen to play representative cricket during the season.  Woods played two matches for the Gentlemen in the Gentlemen v Players fixture, and also represented the South of England cricket team.  Herbie Hewett and Woods also played for the Gentlemen of England and toured North America as part of Lord Hawke's XI at the end of the season.  Hewett and Gerald Fowler both appeared for the Marylebone Cricket Club.

The following players made at least one appearance for Somerset in the County Championship.  Age given is at the start of Somerset's first match of the season (18 May 1891).

County Championship

Season standings
Note: Pld = Played, W = Wins, L = Losses, D = Draws, T = Ties, A = Abandonments, Pts = Points.

Match log

Batting averages

Bowling averages

Other first-class

Match log

References

External links

1891 in English cricket
English cricket seasons in the 19th century
Somerset County Cricket Club seasons